The Good Feeling is a studio album by the Christian McBride Big Band. It won the Grammy Award for Best Large Jazz Ensemble Album at the 54th Annual Grammy Awards in 2012. The record was released on  via the Mack Avenue label.

Background
This is his first full big band recording as a leader. McBride plays with a 17-piece band featuring saxophonists Ron Blake, Loren Schoenberg and Steve Wilson; trumpeters Frank Greene and Nicholas Payton; trombonists Steve Davis, Michael Dease and Douglas Purviance; pianist Xavier Davis; and drummer Ulysses Owens, among others. Together, the band presents six originals going with five jazz standards. McBride said "I’m looking forward to writing more material, and I’m really hoping to keep this concept ‘above sea level".

Reception
Philip Booth of Jazz Times noted "Christian McBride, one of two high-profile veteran bassists making debuts as big-band leaders this season (along with Ron Carter), offers 11 of his arrangements, a mix of original compositions and standards. McBride’s career orchestrating for large ensembles, as he recounts in the liner notes, began a little more than 15 years ago with a commission from the Jazz at Lincoln Center Orchestra. That piece, “Bluesin’ in Alphabet City,” is here, and it’s a charmer, a bluesy swinger with the trombone section’s melody answered by trumpet and saxophone rejoinders before opening up for solos, including a showcase for the leader’s speedy fingerboard flights and chopping-wood tone. Bluesy swagger also marks “In a Hurry,” originally heard on McBride's debut album and here building into a ferocious, criss-crossing bone battle between Michael Dease and James Burton. It's topped off with the leader's quick-witted bowed solo, a shouted chorus, and an extended, aptly explosive drum solo from Ulysses Owens Jr."

Reviewers of SFJAZZ Center wrote "...until 2011's The Good Feeling, McBride had never recorded an album with his own big band. As the title implies, it's a swaggering, hard-swinging session featuring a cast of New York's best sidemen, winning the GRAMMY Award for Best Large Ensemble Jazz Album in 2012.

Jake Kot of Bass Musician said "Great solo performances are lavished on every tune behind a very hip and tight ensemble. Christian himself sounds better than ever, both in section mode, and offering up some very moving bass solos, again, everything we would expect from this very accomplished musician".

Track listing

Personnel 

 Christian McBride – double bass
 Steve Wilson – alto saxophone, flute
 Todd Bashore – alto saxophone, flute
 Ron Blake – tenor saxophone, soprano saxophone, flute
 Todd Williams – tenor saxophone, flute
 Loren Schoenberg – tenor saxophone
 Carl Maraghi – baritone saxophone, bass clarinet
 Frank Greene – trumpet
 Freddie Hendrix – trumpet

 Nicholas Payton – trumpet
 Nabati Isles – trumpet
 James Burton – trombone
 Steve Davis – trombone
 Michael Dease – trombone
 Douglas Purviance – bass trombone
 Xavier Davis – piano
 Ulysses Owens – drums
 Melissa Walker – vocals

References

External links
 Christian McBride Discography

2011 albums
Christian McBride albums
Mack Avenue Records albums
Grammy Award for Best Large Jazz Ensemble Album